Odontarrhena troodi is a 10–25 cm high perennial subshrub. Leaves 5–10 mm long obovate-spatulate, covered with a silvery indumentum. Flowering and sterile shoots on the same plant, On the sterile shots the leaves form terminal clusters. Flowers have 3 mm long golden-yellow petals. The siliques are 7–8 mm long, elliptic and glabrous. Flowers from May to July.

Distribution
Endemic to the Troodos Mountains in Cyprus, from 1300 m altitude to the highest summit of Hionistra.

References

External links
 http://public.fotki.com/PanosS/plants/plants_-_flower/alyssum-troodi-cypr/
 http://eol.org/pages/27737165/overview
 https://www.europeana.eu/portal/record/11616/_OPENUP_SPECIMENS_RBGE_UK_E00379859.html
 http://www.theplantlist.org/tpl/record/kew-2632587
 https://www.gbif.org/species/3045067

Endemic flora of Cyprus
Flora of Europe